A Country Called Home is a 2015 American drama film directed by Anna Axster and starring Imogen Poots, Mackenzie Davis, Ryan Bingham, Mary McCormack and June Squibb.  It is Axster's feature directorial debut.

Cast
Imogen Poots
Mary McCormack
Mackenzie Davis
Ryan Bingham
June Squibb
Shea Whigham
Josh Helman
Norman Bennett

Release
The film premiered at the 2015 LA Film Festival.  It was then released in theaters on February 26, 2016 and on VOD on March 1, 2016.

Reception
The film has a 17% rating on Rotten Tomatoes.  Mark Dujsik of RogerEbert.com awarded the film two and a half stars.  Jesse Hassenger of The A.V. Club graded the film a C.  Katie Walsh of IndieWire graded the film a B−.

References

External links
 
 

2015 drama films
2015 films
American drama films
2010s English-language films
2010s American films